Berardo Bongiovanni (died 1574) was a Roman Catholic prelate who served as Bishop of Camerino (1537–1574) and Apostolic Nuncio to Poland (1560–1563).

Biography
On 5 March 1537, Berardo Bongiovanni was appointed during the papacy of Pope Paul III as Bishop of Camerino.
On 23 April 1560, he was appointed during the papacy of Pope Pius IV as Apostolic Nuncio to Poland. He resigned as Apostolic Nuncio to Poland on May 1563. 
He served as Bishop of Camerino until his death on 12 September 1574.

Episcopal succession

References

External links and additional sources
 (for Chronology of Bishops) 
 (for Chronology of Bishops) 
 (for Chronology of Bishops) 
 (for Chronology of Bishops) 

16th-century Italian Roman Catholic bishops
Bishops appointed by Pope Paul III
Bishops appointed by Pope Pius IV
1574 deaths